Lasiopetalum pterocarpum, commonly known as wing-fruited lasiopetalum, is a species of flowering plant in the family Malvaceae and is endemic to a restricted area in the south-west of Western Australia. It is an open shrub with many densely hairy stems, egg-shaped and lobed leaves and pink and dark red flowers.

Description
The leaves are covered with white and rust-coloured, star-shaped hairs, but become glabrous with age. Flowering occurs from August to December and the fruit have six or more distinct wings.

Taxonomy
Lasiopetalum pterocarpum was first formally described in 2006 by Eleanor Marion Bennett and Kelly Anne Shepherd in the journal Nuytsia from specimens collected in Serpentine National Park in 1995. The specific epithet (pterocarpum) means "winged fruit".

Distribution and habitat
This lasiopetalum is only known from a single population in Serpentine National Park, where it grows in woodland on sloping banks and near creeks.

Conservation status
Lasiopetalum pterocarpum is listed as "endangered" under the Australian Government Environment Protection and Biodiversity Conservation Act 1999 and as Threatened" by the Western Australian Government Department of Biodiversity, Conservation and Attractions, meaning that it is in danger of extinction.

References

pterocarpum
Malvales of Australia
Flora of Western Australia
Plants described in 2006